
Conisholme is a small settlement and civil parish in the East Lindsey district of Lincolnshire, England. The population is included in the civil parish of Grainthorpe.

Community
The major village of North Somercotes is to the east. The parish mostly extends south-west across Conisholme Fen towards the Louth Canal and North Cockerington.

The county council Louth Marsh and district council North Somercotes wards are both Conservative, and represented by Robert Palmer who is also the Chairman of East Lindsey District Council.

The parish church is dedicated to St Peter. It is in the North Somercotes group of churches, with Grainthorpe.

Wind turbines
The farm, operated by Ecotricity, produces enough energy for 13,000 homes.

The turbines were designed by architect Norman Foster and built by Enercon. Construction began in December 2007, and was finished on 17 April 2008.

During the early hours of 4 January 2009, one of the twenty wind turbines was damaged. The story received coverage on the BBC News. Ecotricity, after its preliminary examination and before forensic results, stated that UFOs were "at the bottom of its probability list for the cause", and they were considering that the turbine may have suffered from a lightning strike, collision, metal fatigue, or design, material or maintenance failure.

References

External links

Villages in Lincolnshire
Civil parishes in Lincolnshire
UFO sightings in England
Wind farms in England
East Lindsey District